Joseph Bell (12 March 1861 – 15 April 1912) was a British engineer who served as chief engineer in the engine room of RMS Titanic.

Early life
Joseph Bell was the first son of John Bell, Sr. and Margaret Watson, both agricultural entrepreneurs. He grew up in Farlam, a small village in the Rural District of Brampton, in the county of Cumberland; he had three siblings: Jane (1864), Richard (1865) and John Jr. (1868). His mother Margaret died shortly after giving birth to her last child.

Joseph Bell initially attended a private Primary school in the village of Farlam and, after the death of his mother, he moved with his father and his brothers to Carlisle, between the districts of Edentown and Stanwix; Joseph and the brothers attended Carlisle's Academy William Harrison. In time, his younger brother John decided to migrate to Australia, embarking on the transatlantic SS Great Britain, while the rest of the family remained in Carlisle.

After leaving Carlisle, Joseph Bell moved to Newcastle, doing apprenticeship as an engine fitter at Robert Stephenson and Company.

White Star Line
In 1885, Bell was hired by the White Star Line and worked on many ships that traded with New Zealand and the United States. In 1891 he was promoted to chief mechanical engineer.

Sister Jane married William Hugh Lowthian in 1886 and spent many years living in Ripley, Derbyshire, where he was a bank manager. It was probably at this time that Joseph met Maud Bates, whom he married in 1893; the couple had 4 children: Frances John, called Frank (1896), Marjorie Clare (1899), Eileen Maud (1901), and Ralph Douglas (1908).

In 1911, Joseph found lodging in Belfast, along with his wife and younger son. The two daughters remained at Ripley, cared for by both a housekeeper and her uncles (Bell's sister and brother-in-law), while the then fifteen-year-old Frank was studying at the Grosvenor College in Carlisle and later an apprenticeship at the Harland and Wolff shipyards.

RMS Titanic
After serving on the Olympic, he transferred to the Titanic, where he was given the post of chief engineer. On the night of April 14, shortly before the Titanic hit the iceberg, Bell received an order from the bridge to either stop or reverse the engines (accounts vary), in an attempt to slow the ship. Despite the crew's best efforts, the Titanic could not avoid the immense block of ice. As the ship began to sink, Bell and the engineers remained in the engine room, urging the stokers and firemen to keep the boilers active, allowing the pumps to continue their work and ensuring the electricity remained on as long as possible. According to legend, Bell and his men worked to keep the lights and the power on in order for distress signals to get out and they all died in the bowels of the Titanic. However, according to the historical record, when it became obvious that nothing more could be done, and the flooding was too severe for the pumps to cope, some of the engineers came up onto Titanic open well deck, but by this time all the lifeboats had already left. Greaser Frederick Scott testified to seeing eight engineers gathered at the aft end of the starboard Boat Deck at the end.

Legacy
Bell's body was never recovered. His wife and brother-in-law, William Ralph, inherited his farm in Farlam; he had become its full owner since 1904 after his father's death. The farm was immediately sold because both Bell's wife and children never wanted to live in Farlam.

The parish church of St Faith in Waterloo near Liverpool has a plate commemorating Bell. The village cemetery at Farlam also has a memorial to Bell.

Portrayals
Emerton Court (1958; A Night to Remember)
Terry Forrestal (1997; Titanic)
David Wilmot (2012; Saving The Titanic; PBS TV Movie)

References

Further reading

External links
 Joseph Bell, Chief Engineer on the R.M.S. Titanic at WordPress

1861 births
1912 deaths
Deaths on the RMS Titanic
British Merchant Navy officers
People from Maryport